Elapata remipes is a species of ulidiid or picture-winged fly in the genus Elapata of the family Tephritidae.

References

Ulidiidae